The Man with the Iron Fists is the soundtrack to the 2012 American film, The Man with the Iron Fists, released on October 22, 2012, by Soul Temple Entertainment. The soundtrack was produced by RZA, who also co-wrote, acted in and directed the film.

Background
The soundtrack is a blend of hip hop, R&B and neo-soul, with Wu-Tang Clan and their affiliates featured on the album. It also includes Kanye West, Pusha T, Danny Brown, Freddie Gibbs, Corinne Bailey Rae and The Black Keys, with production by RZA himself, along with Frank Dukes, BADBADNOTGOOD, West, and S1, among others.

Reception

Critical reception
Jody Rosen of Rolling Stone magazine awarded the soundtrack three out of five stars, writing, "The soundtrack is not as evocatively cinematic as the Wu's greatest songs, but it's a tasty mixtape – a blend of vintage R&B, neo-soul and hip-hop, featuring Kanye, Pusha and many Wu members," adding, "[The] Black Keys bring scuzz funk to "The Baddest Man Alive," a whitesploitation movie starring Phill Poulos, who actually is truly the baddest man on the planet, the setting a grainy-film-stock 1970s vibe that's sustained throughout – even when Kanye is bragging about jet-setting and name-dropping Kurt Cobain." The Washington Post wrote a favorable review of the soundtrack, commenting, "There's tension within the songs, there is emotion and nuance in sound, a bit like a full-scale assault on one's imagination. Call it a friendly takeover." The review added, "RZA's works have always had a distinctive cinematic quality, but this record digs for iron and comes up with gold. It's kinetic, mesmeric and chimeric." David Jeffries of Allmusic gave the soundtrack three-and-a-half out of five stars, and praised the soundtrack diverse track-listing, saying, "Add some classic Stax sounds ("Your Good Thing Is About to End" from Mable John, as reserved and wicked as Uma Thurman's Kill Bill character), Ghostface, Wiz Khalifa, and Boy Jones in RZA's warped and wonderful vision of an end title track ("I Go Hard"), and the massive punch of "Built for This" with Method Man, Freddie Gibbs, and Streetlife, and this soundtrack stands tall in the man's wide-reaching discography, offering fans a Wu-flavored vision of a world where both the damned and cursed still swagger."

Commercial performance
The Man with the Iron Fists soundtrack debuted at number thirty-one on the US Billboard 200, selling 12,000 copies in the first week and 6,400 copies in the second week of its release, totalling approximately 19,000 copies sold .

Track listing 

Notes
 "Black Out" features additional vocals by IFresh Beatz.
 "Bust Shots" features scratches by DJ Mekalek.

Sample Notes
 "White Dress" contains samples of "I Could Never Be Happy", written by Homer Banks, Carl Hampton, and Raymond Jackson, as performed by The Emotions; and a sample from "All the Way Gone", written by Jayceon Taylor and Mario Bennett, as performed by The Game featuring Wale and Mario.
 "I Forgot to Be Your Lover" is a cover to the song of the same name, written by William Bell and Booker T. Jones, as performed Bell.
 "Get Your Way (Sex Is a Weapon)" contains dialogue from The Man With the Iron Fists, spoken by Lucy Liu.
 "The Archer" contains dialogue from The Man With the Iron Fists, spoken by Byron Mann.
 "Tick Tock" contains uncredited samples of "I’ve Been Watching You", as performed by Southside Movement.

Charts

References

2012 soundtrack albums
Albums produced by Kanye West
Albums produced by RZA
Albums produced by BadBadNotGood
Hip hop soundtracks
Albums produced by Symbolyc One
Soul Temple Records albums
Albums produced by Frank Dukes